Raphael Rainer Karl Maria Joseph Antonius Ignatius Hubertus Lamoral Prince of Thurn and Taxis (30 May 1906 – 8 June 1993) was the sixth son of Albert, 8th Prince of Thurn and Taxis and his wife Archduchess Margarethe Klementine of Austria. He was the father of Prince Max Emanuel of Thurn and Taxis, the heir presumptive to Albert, 12th Prince of Thurn and Taxis.

Early life

Raphael Rainer was born at Regensburg, Kingdom of Bavaria, the sixth son of Albert, 8th Prince of Thurn and Taxis and his wife Archduchess Margarethe Klementine of Austria Prince Raphael Rainer had six brothers and a sister. One of his brothers was Prince Max Emanuel of Thurn and Taxis (1902–1994), a member of the Order of Saint Benedict known as Pater Emmeram. Raphael Rainer received a humanistic education by private teachers.

Marriage and issue

On 24 May 1932 at Regensburg, Raphael Rainer married Princess Margarete of Thurn and Taxis (19 October 1913 Berlin – 16 June 1997 Füssen). Prince Raphael Rainer and his wife Princess Margarete had one child, a son Prince Max Emanuel of Thurn and Taxis, he was born on 7 September 1935 at Schloss Bullachberg.

Death

He died on 8 June 1993 at age 87 at Schwangau, Germany.

Ancestry

References

External links

 A photograph of Prince Raphael Rainer
 
 
 

1906 births
1993 deaths
Bavarian nobility
German hunters
People from Regensburg
Princes of Thurn und Taxis
German Roman Catholics